Jill Hetherington and Kristine Radford were the defending champions but did not compete that year.

Miho Saeki and Yuka Yoshida won in the final 6–2, 6–3 against Tina Križan and Nana Miyagi.

Seeds
Champion seeds are indicated in bold text while text in italics indicates the round in which those seeds were eliminated.

 Sung-Hee Park /  Shi-Ting Wang (quarterfinals)
 Laura Golarsa /  Christina Singer (semifinals)
 Tina Križan /  Nana Miyagi (final)
 Nancy Feber /  Kyoko Nagatsuka (first round)

Draw

External links
 1996 Volvo Women's Open Doubles Draw

Doubles
Volvo Women's Open - Doubles
 in women's tennis